Salix pyrifolia (syn. Salix balsamifera), the balsam willow, is a species of flowering plant in the family Salicaceae, native to Canada, and the north-central to northeastern United States. A shrub, its leaves emit a balsam-like fragrance. It is available from commercial suppliers.

References

pyrifolia
Flora of Yukon
Flora of the Northwest Territories
Flora of Western Canada
Flora of Eastern Canada
Flora of Minnesota
Flora of Wisconsin
Flora of Illinois
Flora of Michigan
Flora of New York (state)
Flora of Vermont
Flora of New Hampshire
Flora of Maine
Plants described in 1867